Lacrymaria is a genus of fungi in the family Psathyrellaceae. A 2008 estimate placed 14 species in the widespread genus.

Species
Lacrymaria asperospora (Cleland) Watling (1979)
Lacrymaria atricha (Berk.) Kits van Wav. (1995)
Lacrymaria castanophylla (Berk.) Kits van Wav. (1995)
Lacrymaria glareosa (J.Favre) Watling (1979)
Lacrymaria hemisodes (Berk.) Kits van Wav. (1995)
Lacrymaria hypertropicalis (Guzmán, Bandala & Montoya) Cortez (2005)
Lacrymaria ignescens (Lasch) S.Lundell & Nannf. (1979)
Lacrymaria lacrymabunda (Bull.) Pat. (1887)
var. olivacea Häffner (1995)
Lacrymaria phlebophora Pat. (1898)
Lacrymaria pyrotricha (Holmsk.) Konrad & Maubl. (1925)
Lacrymaria rigidipes (Peck) Watling (1979)
Lacrymaria rugocephala (G.F.Atk.) Watling (1979)
Lacrymaria sepulchralis (Singer, A.H.Sm. & Guzmán) Watling (1979)
Lacrymaria subcinnamomea (A.H.Sm.) Watling (1979)

See also
List of Agaricales genera

References

Psathyrellaceae
Agaricales genera
Taxa named by Narcisse Théophile Patouillard
Taxa described in 1887